Father of Four on Bornholm is a 1959 Danish family film directed by Alice O'Fredericks and Robert Saaskin.

Cast
 Karl Stegger as Far
 Else Hvidhøj as Søs
 Otto Møller Jensen as Ole
 Ole Neumann as Lille Per
 Peter Malberg as Onkel Anders
 Agnes Rehni as Fru Sejersen
 Rudi Hansen as Mie
 Christian Arhoff as Frisør
 Helmer Bonde as Torben
 Jon Iversen as Torbens bedstefar
 Preben Mahrt as Filminstruktøren
 Marianne Schleiss as Skuespillerinden Lilly
 Henrik Wiehe as Skuespilleren Allan
 Einar Juhl as Rektor
 Kirsten Passer as Lærerinde
 Minna Jørgensen as Frk. Kofoed
 Henry Nielsen as Fisker
 Ib Mossin as Peter

External links

1959 films
1950s Danish-language films
Films directed by Alice O'Fredericks
Films scored by Sven Gyldmark
ASA Filmudlejning films
Father of Four
Films set in the Baltic Sea
Films set on islands